Erna Solberg (born 24 February 1961) is a Norwegian politician and the current Leader of the Opposition. She served as the 35th prime minister of Norway from 2013 to 2021, and has been Leader of the Conservative Party since May 2004.

Solberg was first elected to the Storting in 1989, and served as Minister of Local Government and Regional Development in Bondevik's Second Cabinet from 2001 to 2005. During her tenure, she oversaw the tightening of immigration policy and the preparation of a proposed reform of the administrative divisions of Norway. After the 2005 election, she chaired the Conservative Party parliamentary group until 2013. Solberg has emphasized the social and ideological basis of Conservative policies, though the party also has become visibly more pragmatic.

After winning the September 2013 election, Solberg became prime minister of Norway, the second woman to hold the position, after Gro Harlem Brundtland. Solberg's Cabinet, often informally called the "Blue-Blue Cabinet", was initially a two-party minority government consisting of the Conservative and Progress parties. The cabinet established a formalized cooperation with the Liberal and Christian Democratic parties in the Storting. The government was reelected in the 2017 election and was extended to include the Liberal Party in January 2018. This extended minority coalition is informally called the "Blue-Green cabinet". In May 2018, Solberg surpassed Kåre Willoch to become the longest-serving prime minister of Norway from the Conservative Party. The government was further extended in January 2019 to include the Christian Democratic Party, and thereby secured a majority in Parliament. On 13 September 2021, following the parliamentary election which overturned her government's majority in the Storting, she conceded defeat, leaving it to the Labour Party's Jonas Gahr Støre to form a new government. On 12 October 2021, Solberg and her government tendered their resignations to King Harald V, clearing the way for Støre to form a new government, which was finalised two days later. She then returned to being the Leader of the Opposition.

Early life and education
Solberg was born 24 February 1961 in Bergen in western Norway and grew up in the affluent Kalfaret neighbourhood. Her father, Asbjørn Solberg (1925–1989), worked as a consultant in the Bergen Sporvei, and her mother, Inger Wenche Torgersen (1926–2016), was an office worker. Her parents are both executives. Solberg has two sisters, one older, one younger.

Solberg had some struggles at school, and at the age of 16 was diagnosed with dyslexia. She was nevertheless an active and talkative contributor in class. In her final year as a high-school student in 1979, she was elected to the board of the School Student Union of Norway, and in the same year led the national charity event Operasjon Dagsverk, in which students collected money for Jamaica.

In 1986, she graduated with her cand.mag. degree in sociology, political science, statistics and economics from the University of Bergen. In her final year, she led the Students' League of the Conservative Party in Bergen.

Since 1996 she has been married to Sindre Finnes, a businessman and former Conservative Party politician, with whom she has two children. The family has lived in both Bergen and Oslo.

Early political career

Local government
Solberg was a deputy member of Bergen city council in the periods 1979–1983 and 1987–1989, the last period on the executive committee. She chaired local and municipal chapters of the Young Conservatives and the Conservative Party.

Parliamentarian
She was first elected to the Storting (Norwegian Parliament) from Hordaland in 1989 and has been re-elected five times. She was also the leader of the national Conservative Women's Association, from 1994 to 1998.

Minister of Local Government and Regional Development
From 2001 to 2005 Solberg served as the Minister of Local Government and Regional Development under Prime Minister Kjell Magne Bondevik. Her alleged tough policies in this department, including a firm stance on asylum policy, earned her the nickname "Jern-Erna" (Norwegian for "Iron Erna") in the media. 
In fact, numbers show that the Bondevik government, of 2001–2005, actually let in thousands more asylum seekers than the subsequent centre-left Red-Green government, of 2005–2009. In 2003, Solberg proposed introducing Islamic Sharia Councils in Norway after being informed of the existence of such councils in the United Kingdom, and, in 2004, said that she wished to increase immigration to Norway.

As Minister, Solberg instructed the Norwegian Directorate of Immigration to expel Mulla Krekar, being a danger to national security. Later, terrorism charges were filed against Krekar for a death threat he uttered in 2010 against Erna Solberg.

She had Mordechai Vanunu denied political asylum so as not to damage relations with Israel.

Party Leader
She served as deputy leader of the Conservative Party from 2002 to 2004 and, in 2004, she became the party leader.

Prime Minister of Norway (2013–2021)

 

Solberg became the head of government after winning the general election on 9 September 2013 and was appointed Prime Minister on 16 October 2013. Solberg is Norway's second female Prime Minister after Gro Harlem Brundtland.

The Government was re-elected in 2017, making Solberg the country's first conservative leader to win re-election since the 1980s. The centre-right parties were also able to maintain the majority in the Storting.

Erna Solberg has combined numerous national positions as Minister, Parliamentarian and regional politician with a strong commitment to global solutions for development, growth and conflict resolution.

She also negotiated with the Liberals to join the government in 2018. The Liberals officially joined the Solberg Cabinet on 17 January 2018. After the Christian Democrats alliance conflict that lasted from September to November 2018, they eventually negotiated to join the Solberg Cabinet on the grounds of a minor change in the abortion law, something that caused harsh backlash from the public and critics alike. The Christian Democrats officially joined the Cabinet on 22 January 2019.

She faced tensions between the components of her majority, leading to a break with the Progress Party.

She inherited the nickname "Iron Erna", in reference to the former British Prime Minister Margaret Thatcher, for her relentless management of the migration crisis in 2015, during which she had tightened reception conditions.

To cope with the fall in oil prices in March 2020, her government adopted a series of measures to support businesses, such as simplifying procedures for temporary layoffs of employees, and tax privileges.

COVID-19 pandemic in Norway
One day after her 60th birthday in 2021 during the COVID-19 pandemic in Norway, Solberg breached national health guidelines by going to a restaurant in Geilo with her husband and 13 family members to celebrate her birthday.  The guidelines stated that restaurants only can hold 10 people of the same cohort. In March, she apologised for breaching guidelines and that she didn't think of it properly before being questioned by NRK. She further stated that she should have known better. She was fined 20,000 NOK ($2,352) after a police investigation was conducted.

On 24 September 2021, her government announced a lift for all national major measures, taking effect the day after at 4:00pm, officially reopening the country.

International engagements
As Prime Minister, and former Chair of the Norwegian delegation to the NATO Parliamentary Assembly, she has championed transatlantic values and security.

In 2018 she assembled a global High Level Panel on sustainable ocean economy and introduced the topic at the G7 Summit. Her Government supports the World Bank's PROBLUE initiative to prevent marine damage.

From 2016 the Prime Minister has co-chaired the UN Secretary General's Advocacy group for the Sustainable Development Goals. Among the goals, she takes a particular interest in access to quality education for all, in particular girls and children in conflict areas. This was also central in her work as MDG Advocate from 2013 to 2016.

In one her many keynote speeches she stated that there is still a need for traditional aid and humanitarian assistance in marginalised and conflict-ridden areas of the world. The SDGs, however, take a holistic view of global development, and integrate economic, social and environmental factors.

Solberg has shown particular interest in gender issues, such as girl's rights and education. Together with Graça Machel she has expressed the hope that in 2030 no factors such as poverty, gender and cultural beliefs will prevent any of today's ambitious young girls from standing confidently on the world stage.

In 2016, she held a lecture at the International Institute for Strategic Studies The Global Goals in Singapore, addressing a road map to a Sustainable, Fair and More Peaceful Futurethe International Institute for Strategic Studies.

Solberg has secured significant financial support for the Global Partnership for Education and hosted the Global Finance Facility for women's and children's health pledging Conference in Oslo in November 2018. Her firm belief is that investment in education will accelerate progress on all other SDG goals.

In April 2017, she held a speech on globalization and development at Peking University in Beijing.

She was awarded the inaugural Global Citizen World Leader Award in 2018 for her international engagement.

In October 2019, she criticized the unilateral Turkish invasion of the Kurdish areas in Syria, but dismissed calls for suspending Turkey from NATO.

In Solberg's speech to the UN General Assembly in 2019 she advocated for Norway's candidacy for a non-permanent seat on the Security Council for 2021–2022. She upheld that UN needs to be strengthened and that the world needs strong multilateral cooperation and institutions to tackle global challenges such as climate change, cyber security and terrorism.

In May 2021, it was reported that Danish Defence Intelligence Service collaborated with National Security Agency to wiretap on fellow EU members and leaders, leading to wide backlash among EU countries and demands for explanation from Danish and American governments. Solberg said that, "It's unacceptable if countries which have close allied co-operation feel the need to spy on one another."

Other news stories
In April 2008, it was revealed that Solberg, as Minister of Local Government and Regional Development in 2004, had rejected a request for asylum in Norway by the Israeli nuclear whistleblower Mordechai Vanunu. While the Norwegian Directorate of Immigration had been prepared to grant Vanunu asylum, it was then decided that the application could not be accepted because Vanunu's application had been made outside the borders of Norway. An unclassified document revealed that Solberg and the government considered that extraditing Vanunu from Israel could be seen as an action against Israel and thus unfitting to the Norwegian government's traditional position as a friend of Israel and as a political player in the Middle East. Solberg rejected this criticism and defended her decision.

In 2014, she participated at the Agriculture and Food meeting which was held by Sylvi Listhaug where Minister of Transportation Ketil Solvik-Olsen and Minister of Climate and Environment Tine Sundtoft also were present. Later on, the four took a picture which appeared on the Government.no website on 14 March the same year. In April of the same year she criticized European Court over data retention which Telenor Group argued can be used without court proceedings.

In 2017, the Russian Embassy in Oslo had accused Norwegian officials and intelligence of using "false and disconnected anti-Russian rhetoric" and "scaring Norway's population" about a "mythical Russian threat". In response, Prime Minister Solberg said: "This is an example of Russian propaganda that often comes when there's a focus on security policy. There is nothing in this that's new to us."

Solberg has tried to maintain and improve the China–Norway relations, which have been damaged since the Norwegian Nobel Committee decided to give the Nobel Peace Prize to Chinese dissident Liu Xiaobo in 2010. In response to his death, caused by organ failure while in government custody on 13 July 2017, Solberg said: "It is with deep grief that I received the news of Liu Xiaobo's passing. Liu Xiaobo was for decades a central voice for human rights and China's further development."

On 20 May 2022, it was announced that Solberg was becoming a board member of Global Citizen. Of her entry, she said: "I say yes to this position because Global Citizen is perhaps the organization in the world that has the greatest potential to mobilize people, especially young people around the world, to fight poverty and achieve the UN's sustainability goals".

Honours

National honours
 Commander of the Order of St. Olav (2005)
 King Harald V's Jubilee Medal 1991–2016  (2016)

References

External links

|-

|-

1961 births
20th-century Norwegian politicians
20th-century Norwegian women politicians
21st-century Norwegian politicians
21st-century Norwegian women politicians
Leaders of the Conservative Party (Norway)
Living people
Members of the Storting
Ministers of Local Government and Modernisation of Norway
Norwegian Lutherans
Women members of the Storting
Politicians from Bergen
Prime Ministers of Norway
People educated at Langhaugen Upper Secondary School
University of Bergen alumni
Women prime ministers
Women government ministers of Norway